Equestrian was contested at the 1998 Asian Games in Fort Adison Riding Club, Saraburi, Thailand. Equestrian was contested from 8 to 19 December 1998. There were three equestrian disciplines: dressage, eventing and jumping. All three disciplines are further divided into individual and team contests for a total of six events.

Medalists

Medal table

References
 Results
 Results

External links 
 Olympic Council of Asia

 
1998 Asian Games events
1998
Asian Games